Eugnosta acanthana is a species of moth of the family Tortricidae. It was first described by Józef Razowski in 1967, and is found in north-eastern Afghanistan.

References

Eugnosta
Moths described in 1967
Taxa named by Józef Razowski